Somerset East, officially renamed KwaNojoli in March 2023, is a town in the Blue Crane Route Local Municipality in the Eastern Cape, South Africa. It was founded by Lord Charles Somerset in 1825.

The Blue Crane Route follows the national road R63 from Pearston, via Somerset East, to Cookhouse. Somerset East, at the foot of the Boschberg Mountains, is a small town that's known for its natural environment and for its provincial heritage sites and buildings.

The forested, mountainous backdrop frames the town (which is within sight of 16 waterfalls). The wooded Boschberg Nature Reserve is in the area, and has a number of hiking trails - including a 15 km circular route to an overnight hut at the summit of the mountain. As the route's name suggest, Somerset East is a bird-watching destination - other outdoor adventures include trout fishing on five local dams, as well as rainbow and brown trout fishing in the Glen Avon Waterfall pools, malaria free safari and hunting operations. There is also a 9-hole golf course.

Notable buildings in the town include the Old Wesleyan Chapel, which now houses the Somerset East Museum, and the officers' mess, which now houses the largest collection of paintings by the South African artist Walter Battiss.

Annual events include the Biltong Festival, which was started in 1991, the Bruintjieshoogte Marathon, Bruintjieshoogte Cycle Tour (run between Pearston & Somerset East) and the Spring Rose & Flower show. Somerset East is known for producing roses.

History

The first settler in this area was Willem Prinsloo. He settled under the Boschberg, close to where the Museum is today. Prinsloo was the unofficial field cornet of the district where at least 20 other families had settled by 1774. They send a petition to Cape Town asking for the establishment of a Drostdy and a church in the area, which led to the establishment of Graaff-Reinet.

At some stage, Prinsloo gave up parts of his farm and a farmer named Jakobus Cornelius Ismael Safanya Otto moved into the corner now known as Bestershoek. He was followed by the Trichardt and Bester families.

Lord Charles Somerset, taking up the ideas promulgated by Cradock and Caledon that there should be a settlement on the Eastern Frontier, initiated a plan for an experimental farm in the area. American botanist, dr. Mackrill, was given orders to find a suitable farm, and was told to look at three places, the Gamtoos Valley, the Swartkops Valley and Boschberg. He chose the latter.

The farm was established in 1815, for the purpose of improving stockbreeding in the Cape Colony and providing produce for the soldiers at the Frontier. It was named "Somerset Farm".

In 1825 the project was cancelled, a new Drostdy was declared, and the town of Somerset was established. The "East" suffix was only added on 30 years later in order to differentiate it from Somerset West, a town in the Western Cape.

Educational institutions
Gill College is one of the oldest colleges in the Eastern Cape, founded in 1869, after a donation from Dr. William Gill.

Aeroville School is a secondary school for grades 8 to 12, on the edge of Somerset East. It is twinned with Golden Hillock School in Birmingham, UK.

Provincial Hospital
Somerset East has a medium-sized government-funded hospital, the Andries Vosloo Hospital.

Coat of arms
Somerset East established a municipality in 1884.  By 1931, the town council had assumed a coat of arms.

The shield was divided horizontally.  The upper half depicted a bushbuck on a golden background.  The lower half was divided vertically, depicting a swallow on a red background and a sunflower on a black background.  The swallow was taken from the arms of Gill College and the sunflower from the badge of a local school.

The crest was a phoenix issuing from a golden crown, the supporters were a goat and a ram, and the motto was Foy pour devoir.

References

External links

Official Somerset East Information Guide
Tourism information site for Somerset East
Gill College
Timothy Training Institute

Populated places in the Blue Crane Route Local Municipality
Populated places established in 1825